The 1999 Football League Cup Final was played between Tottenham Hotspur and Leicester City, at Wembley on Sunday, 21 March 1999.

Tottenham won the game, and their third League Cup, with an injury-time diving header from Allan Nielsen after a cross from the right from Steffen Iversen had been blocked by goalkeeper Kasey Keller. Justin Edinburgh became the last player to be sent off at the old Wembley, after angrily waving his arm towards Robbie Savage following a particularly tough Savage challenge.  In the last few minutes of the game, Ramon Vega made a last-ditch sliding tackle to deny Emile Heskey a goal for Leicester, after Ian Walker rushed off his line, and Allan Nielsen scored a diving header.

Road to Wembley

Match

Details

References

External links

1998–99 Football League
1999
League Cup Final 1999
League Cup Final 1999
1999 sports events in London
March 1999 sports events in the United Kingdom